Jasper Morrison (born 1959) is an English product and furniture designer. He is known for the refinement and apparent simplicity of his designs. In a rare interview with the designer, he is quoted as saying: "Objects should never shout".

Early life and education
Morrison was born in London, England. He was educated at Bryanston School in Dorset, England. He received a Bachelor of Design degree from Kingston Polytechnic Design School in 1982 and a master's degree in Design from the Royal College of Art, London, in 1985. He also studied at the Berlin University of the Arts, formerly the Hochschule für Bildende Künste. 

He has spoken about his childhood memories of the Braun SK 4 "Snow White's Coffin" radiogram (designed by Hans Gugelot and Dieter Rams in 1956), which he first saw in the "Scandinavian style study" of his grandfather's house, and how "The room and the record player both had a very important influence on [his] choice in becoming a designer."

Work and career 
He has designed products and furniture for many manufacturers and brands such as Alessi, Alias, Cappellini, Emeco, Hermès, Ideal Standard, Issey Miyake, Olivetti, Samsung, Sony, Rosenthal, SCP, Üstra, and Vitra. Morrison is the lead designer at boutique Swiss consumer technology company Punkt., known for its minimalist MP01 and MP02 mobile phones. He has also collaborated with the Japanese retail company MUJI on a variety of products ranging from houseware to housing. 

Morrison curated the Super Normal exhibition with Japanese designer Naoto Fukasawa in 2006, which presented 200 ordinary or anonymously designed products that were devoid of gimmicks and branding.

In a review of Morrison's 2015 exhibition Thingness at Le Grand-Hornu, the design critic Alice Rawsthorn writes: "Mr. Morrison, 55, is one of the most influential product designers of our time." More recently, a 2020 article about the designer in la Repubblica described him as "the anti-Philippe Starck par excellence" whose "projects are often the result of a long gestation to achieve simplicity, elegance and discretion."

His work has been widely exhibited and is held in the permanent collections of institutions such as the British Museum, Victoria and Albert (V&A), and Design Museum in London, the Vitra Design Museum in Germany, as well as the Museum of Modern Art (MoMA) in New York. 

Morrison's designs have received many awards including the Compasso d'Oro, Good Design Award, and 12 iF Product Design Awards. 

In March 2007, he was awarded an honorary doctorate in Design from Kingston University. 

Morrison received the Isamu Noguchi Award in 2015, and in 2020 he was named both "Designer of the Year" by the Elle Decoration British Design Awards, as well as the German Design Award "Personality of the Year".

Morrison was appointed Commander of the Order of the British Empire (CBE) in the UK 2020 Birthday Honours for services to design.

Selected works

Selected exhibitions 
 1988 Some New Items for the Home, DAAD Galerie, Berlin, Germany
 1989 Some New Items for the Home (Part II, with Vitra), Galerie Facsimile, Milan, Italy
 2006 Super Normal, (curated by Jasper Morrison and Naoto Fukasawa), Axis Gallery, Tokyo, Japan
 2011 Jasper Morrison: Danish Design: I Like It!, Danish Museum of Decorative Art, Copenhagen, Denmark
 2015 Thingness, Grand-Hornu, Boussu, Belgium
 2018 Objects & Atmosphere, Iittala & Arabia Design Centre, Helsinki
 2019 Corks, exhibition of cork editions, Kasmin Gallery, New York
 2022 Early Work, Jasper Morrison shop, London, England

Publications

 
 Morrison, Jasper (1992). A World Without Words. Tony Arefin.

 
 
 
 
 
 
 
 
 Morrison, Jasper (March 28, 2013). James Irvine obituary. The Guardian. ISSN 0261-3077.

References

External links

 
 Jasper Morrison on designing from personal experience Design Indaba, Cape Town
 Jasper Morrison biography, awards, products

1959 births
Living people
Designers from London
People educated at Bryanston School
Alumni of Kingston University
Alumni of the Royal College of Art
Berlin University of the Arts alumni
English industrial designers
English furniture designers
Industrial design
Commanders of the Order of the British Empire
Compasso d'Oro Award recipients
Royal Designers for Industry